Qader Khalaj (also Romanized as Qāder Khalaj; also known as Ghader Khalaj and Qādīr Khala) is a village in Boghrati Rural District, Sardrud District, Razan County, Hamadan Province, Iran. At the 2006 census, its population was 1,308, in 265 families.

References 

Populated places in Razan County